Heiða Björg Hilmisdóttir (born 21 February 1971) is an Icelandic politician. Heiða has been the vice chairman of the Social Democratic Alliance since February 2017. She is the former chairman of the party's women's movement and she is a city councillor in Reykjavík.

Political career 
Hilmisdottir was the chairman of the Women's Movement in Social Democratic Alliance from 2013 to 2015. She took a seat on the Reykjavík City Council in 2015 where she has been in the executive board for the city. Hilmisdottir has been the chair of the Reykjavík Violence Prevention Committee since its establishment, which was approved at a women's celebration meeting of the city council on the occasion of the 100th anniversary of women's suffrage on 31 March 2015.

Hilmisdottir was second on the Samfylkingin's list in the 2018 city council elections and was elected chairman of the Reykjavík Welfare Council at a meeting of the city council on 19 June 2019. Hilmisdottir became vice chairman of the Association of Local Authorities in Iceland in 2018, she is a member of the board of Félagsbústaðir, social housing company and is vice president for ECAD, European Cities Action Network for Drug Free Societies. Hilmisdottir is vice president for the Icelandic Association of Local Authorities and is in the policy committee in the Council of European Municipalities and regions.

Hilmisdottir is a representative in the Presidency of Party of European Socialists, that holds strategic discussion on progressive priorities for the future of Europe.

Hilmisdottir was elected chairman of the executive board of the party on 4 June 2016 and elected vice chairman of the Social Democratic Alliance 4 February 2017, but the party had just emerged from the parliamentary elections where the party received only 5.7% of the vote. She has been re-elected twice, first in 2018 and then in 2020. Hilmisdottir is a feminist and took active part in the #metoo movement in Iceland and was the spokesperson for women in politics under the hashtag #ískuggavaldsins. Welfare politics outside Iceland.

Professional life 
Before taking a seat in the city council, Hilmisdottir worked as the head of the food and nutrition services at Landspítali University hospital. She was the Vice-Chair of the MS Association in Iceland, the vice chair and later Chair of the Nordic MS Association, the Chair of the Iceland Nutrition Society and a member of the Representative Council of EFAD The European Federation of the Associations of Dietitians.

She has covered food and nutrition in the media, worked as a journalist, taught at the University of Iceland, she is a published author of two cookbooks Samlokur with Bryndís Eva Birgisdóttir and Af bestu lyst 4

Education 
Hilmisdottir is educated as a dietitian and administrative dietitian, and has a M.Sc. in nutrition management from the University of Gothenburg. She has an executive MBA degree from Reykjavík University and a diploma in positive psychology from the University of Iceland.

References 

Heida Bjorg Hilmisdottir
Heida Bjorg Hilmisdottir
1971 births
Living people
University of Gothenburg alumni
Reykjavík University alumni
Academic staff of the University of Iceland
21st-century Icelandic women writers